Soldi is an Italian surname. Notable people with the surname include:

Andrea Soldi (1703–1771), Italian portraitist 
Ester Soldi (born 1970), Italian horse rider
Raúl Soldi (1905–1994), Argentine painter

Italian-language surnames